Kolonia Bogoria  (till 31 December 2000 as at Bogoria Kolonia and till 31 December 2005 with type of settlement as of colony independent) is a village in the administrative district of Gmina Bogoria, within Staszów County, Świętokrzyskie Voivodeship, in south-central Poland.

The village has a population of  257.

Demography 
According to the 2002 Poland census, there were 251 people residing in Kolonia Bogoria colony, of whom 46.2% were male and 53.8% were female. In the village, the population was spread out, with 30.7% under the age of 18, 41.4% from 18 to 44, 17.9% from 45 to 64, and 10% who were 65 years of age or older.
 Figure 1. Population pyramid of colony in 2002 – by age group and sex

References

Kolonia Bogoria